The Ziller is a right tributary to the Inn, in the Zillertal in Tyrol, Austria. It springs from the ridge of the Zillertal Alps, and feeds the Zillergründl Dam. In Mayrhofen it receives the Zemmbach (that in turn receives the Tuxbach. By Zell am Ziller it receives the Gerlosbach, before it flows into the Inn by Strass im Zillertal.

For historical reasons, the Ziller—first mentioned in 927 as Zilare—for most of its course makes up the border between the Diocese of Innsbruck on the west and the Archdiocese of Salzburg on the east. The Ziller today shows a good presence of brown trout and rainbow trout, as well as grayling.

References

Rivers of Tyrol (state)
Braided rivers in Europe
Rivers of Austria